Emma Heesters (born 8 January 1996) (pronunciation: emā hīsṭars) is a Dutch singer and television personality, mainly known for performing covers of popular songs on her own YouTube channel. She began her music career in 2014 and as of August 2022 has over 5.77 million subscribers on YouTube.

Early life 
Heesters was born in the village of 's-Gravenpolder in the province of Zeeland as the child of Ludo and Willian Heesters. From a young age, she started vocal and dance lessons, including ballet. In 2004, at the age of 8, she won the provincial preselection of the Kinderen voor Kinderen Songfestival. Shortly before the performance, Heesters had broken her leg, having to sit in a wheelchair while singing. As a result, she had a television debut on the eponymous show on NPO Zapp, where she performed "100 kleine feestjes". Later on, she acted in a few musicals as a child star. During her teen years, she started singing as part of numerous cover bands, which she stopped doing once she graduated school. In 2013, she graduated from the Dalton Plan school Roncalli in Bergen op Zoom with a havo certificate, specialising in the economy and society profile.

Career 
In 2019 she was the first Dutch winner of MTV's Push Award and gained Platinum status for her single "Pa Olvidarte" with Rolf Sanchez, she featured in a song by the band Boyce Avenue plus collaborated with them on their European tour, and took to television performing in Beste Zangers a Dutch television program, the web series Jachtseason of StukTV, and the game show, I Can See Your Voice.

Heesters was named by Top40 NL as the most successful Dutch artist of the year so far in 2020 and later in November was named winner of MTV EMA's Best Dutch Act.

Favorite covers

Singles

References

External links 
 Official Website
 

Dutch singers
Dutch songwriters
Living people
1996 births